Diodio, or West Goodenough, is an Austronesian language spoken in Milne Bay Province, Papua New Guinea, on Goodenough Island, which it shares with Bwaidoka, Iduna, and Kaninuwa.

References 

Nuclear Papuan Tip languages
Languages of Milne Bay Province